Juan de Liermo Hermosa (1522 – 26 July 1582) was a Roman Catholic prelate who served as Archbishop of Santiago de Compostela (1582) and Bishop of Mondoñedo (1574–1582).

Biography
Juan de Liermo Hermosa was born in San Martín de Liermo, Spain. On 4 June 1574, he was appointed during the papacy of Pope Gregory XIII as Bishop of Mondoñedo. On 8 January 1582, he was appointed during the papacy of Pope Gregory XIII as Archbishop of Santiago de Compostela. He served as Archbishop of Santiago de Compostela until his death on 26 July 1582.

References

External links and additional sources
 (for Chronology of Bishops) 
 (for Chronology of Bishops) 
 (for Chronology of Bishops) 
 (for Chronology of Bishops) 

16th-century Roman Catholic archbishops in France
1522 births
1582 deaths
Bishops appointed by Pope Gregory XIII